The Magical Negro is a supporting stock character in fiction who, by use of special insight or powers often of a supernatural or quasi-mystical nature, helps the white protagonist get out of trouble. African-American filmmaker Spike Lee popularized the term, deriding the archetype of the "super-duper magical negro" in 2001 while discussing films with students at Washington State University and at Yale University.
 
The Magical Negro is a subset of the more generic numinous Negro, a term coined by Richard Brookhiser in National Review. The latter term refers to saintly, respected, or heroic black protagonists or mentors.

The following list represents examples of the archetype that have been proposed or discussed.

Film and television

1980s and earlier 
Uncle Remus (James Baskett) in Song of the South (1946)
Homer Smith (Sidney Poitier) in Lilies of the Field (1963)
Super Soul (Cleavon Little) in Vanishing Point (1971)
Grover Muldoon (Richard Pryor) in Silver Streak (1976)
Big Jim Slade (Manny Perry) in The Kentucky Fried Movie (1977)
Snoe (Clarence Muse) in The Black Stallion (1979)
Dick Hallorann (Scatman Crothers) in The Shining (1980)
Mr. Bloom (Scatman Crothers) in Twilight Zone: The Movie (1983)
Guinan in Star Trek: The Next Generation (1987-1994)

1990s 
Oda Mae Brown (Whoopi Goldberg) in Ghost (1990)
Azeem (Morgan Freeman) in Robin Hood: Prince of Thieves (1991)
Vinnie (Laurence Fishburne) in Searching for Bobby Fischer (1993)
Benjamin Buford "Bubba" Blue (Mykelti Williamson) in Forrest Gump (1994)
Moses (Bill Cobbs) in The Hudsucker Proxy (1994)
Ellis Boyd "Red" Redding (Morgan Freeman) in The Shawshank Redemption (1994)
Ram Dass (Errol Sitahal) in A Little Princess (1995)
Chubbs (Carl Weathers) in Happy Gilmore (1996)
Kazaam (Shaquille O'Neal) in Kazaam (1996)
Arthur Chaney (Bill Cobbs) in Air Bud (1997)
Ruby Rhod (Chris Tucker) in The Fifth Element (1997)
Minerva (Irma P. Hall) in Midnight in the Garden of Good and Evil (1997)
Lamont (Guy Torry) in American History X (1998)
 Rastaman (Amiri Baraka) in Bulworth (1998)
G (Eddie Murphy) in Holy Man (1998)
Albert Lewis ("Doc") (Cuba Gooding Jr.) in What Dreams May Come (1998)
Rufus (Chris Rock) in Dogma (1999)
John Coffey (Michael Clarke Duncan) in The Green Mile (1999)
Morpheus (Laurence Fishburne) and the Oracle (Gloria Foster / Mary Alice) in The Matrix (1999) and its sequels

2000s 
Elliot's cellmate/God (Gabriel Casseus) in Bedazzled (2000)
Cash (Don Cheadle) in The Family Man (2000)
Bagger Vance (Will Smith) in The Legend of Bagger Vance (2000)
Tommy Johnson, (Chris Thomas King) in O Brother, Where Art Thou?, the accompanying guitarist who claims he sold his soul to the devil in exchange for his musical skill
The Blind Seer (Lee Weaver) in O Brother Where Art Thou? (2000)
Jezelle Gay Hartman (Patricia Belcher), a clairvoyant who sacrifices herself to warn and protect two young, white, twentysomething siblings in Jeepers Creepers (2001)
Abou Fatma (Djimon Hounsou) in The Four Feathers (2002)
Mateo (Djimon Hounsou) in In America (2002)
God (Morgan Freeman) in the films Bruce Almighty (2003) and Evan Almighty (2007)
Alex "Hitch" Hitchens (Will Smith) in Hitch (2005)
Sam (Morgan Freeman) in Unleashed (2005)
Lucius Fox (Morgan Freeman) in Batman Begins (2005) and its sequels The Dark Knight (2008) The Dark Knight Rises (2012).
Charles (Afemo Omilami) in Hounddog (2007)
August (Queen Latifah), May (Sophie Okonedo) and June (Alicia Keys) in The Secret Life of Bees (2008)
Louise (Jennifer Hudson) in Sex and the City (2008), where Carrie Bradshaw's emotional recuperation depends entirely on the labor of her plucky black personal assistant, who is disengaged from the storyline as soon as Carrie starts to feel better.

2010s 
 Harry "Red" Newman (Danny Glover) in Legendary (2010)
Brother Sam (Mos Def/Yasiin Bey), a character who appears in five episodes of the sixth season of Dexter (2011)
The janitor (Jordan Peele) and the copier repair man (Keegan-Michael Key) in a "magic negro" sketch on Key & Peele (2012)
Evelyn (Alfre Woodard) in Annabelle (2014)
Rich Purnell (Donald Glover) in The Martian (2015)
Chief Gus Mancuso (Laurence Fishburne) in Passengers (2016)
Keith (John Legend) in La La Land (2016)
Mr. Church (Eddie Murphy) in Mr. Church (2016)
Denver Moore (Djimon Hounsou) in Same Kind of Different as Me (2017)
Ron Strickland (Ice Cube) in Fist Fight (2017)
Don Shirley (Mahershala Ali) in Green Book (2018)
Elizabeth Howard (Crystal R. Fox) in Big Little Lies (2019)
The Salesman (Samuel L. Jackson) in Unicorn Store (2019)
 Madame Xanadu (Jeryl Prescott) in Swamp Thing (2019)
Jasper John (Wayne Dehard) in The Peanut Butter Falcon (2019)
Genie (Will Smith) in Aladdin (2019)

2020s 
Peter (Yashua Mack) in Wendy (2020)
Ebo Odom (Leslie Odom Jr.) in Music (2021)
Fab G (Billy Porter) in Cinderella  (2021)

Literature 
Jim in Mark Twain's 1884 book the Adventures of Huckleberry Finn and its adaptations.
A recurring archetype in Stephen King's novels as well as some adaptations of his work:
Dick Hallorann in The Shining (1977) novel, the 1980 film adaptation (Scatman Crothers), and the 1997 TV miniseries (Melvin Van Peebles)
 Mother Abagail in The Stand (1978) novel and the 1994 TV adaptation (Ruby Dee)
Lester "Speedy" Parker in The Talisman (1984).
John Coffey in The Green Mile (1996) novel and its 1999 film adaptation (played by Michael Clarke Duncan)

Video games
Far Cry 3: according to writer John Walker, the plot follows an inverted 'Magic Negro' trope.

See also
 Noble savage
 Stereotypes of African Americans
 Tokenism
 Xenocentrism

References

Magical Negro occurrences in fiction, List of
African American-related lists